The Unimaginable Life is the ninth studio album by American singer-songwriter Kenny Loggins, released on July 8, 1997 to coincide with his book of the same name that he co-wrote with his second wife, Julia. The liner notes include excerpts from the book.

Track listing
 "Let the Pendulum Swing"; Poem written and read by Julia Loggins (Julia Loggins, Steve Wood) – 2:17
 "Just Breathe" (Loggins, Chris Rodriguez, Steve George) – 6:10
 "I Am Not Hiding" (Loggins, Steve George) – 5:05
 "All I Ask" (Loggins,  Babyface) – 6:00
 "Now That I Know Love" (Loggins, Steve George) – 7:03
 "The Art of Letting Go" (Loggins, Michael Ruff) – 7:28
 "One Chance at a Time" (Loggins, Glen Ballard) – 7:18
 "Love's Got Nothin' to Prove" (Loggins, John Barnes) – 5:27
 "This Island Earth" (Loggins) – 5:20
 "No Doubt About Love" (Loggins,  Babyface) – 4:26
 "The Rest of Your Life" (K. Loggins, Julia Loggins, Jonathan Butler) – 4:57
 "Birth Energy" (Loggins) – 6:41
 "The Unimaginable Life" (Loggins, David Foster) – 6:05
 "Your Spirit and My Spirit" (Loggins) – 1:46

Personnel 
 Kenny Loggins – lead vocals 
 Steve George – keyboards
 Greg Phillinganes – keyboards
 Michael Ruff – keyboards
 John Barnes – Synclavier
 Walter Afanasieff – keyboards (13), synthesizer (13), bass (13), drum programming (13), programming (13), arrangements (13)
 Dan Shea – additional keyboards (13), additional programming (13)
 Gary Cimirelli – additional programming (13)
 Vernon "Ice" Black – guitar 
 Earl Klugh – guitar
 Michael Landau – electric guitar 
 Ray Parker Jr. – guitar 
 Dean Parks – acoustic guitar 
 Tim Pierce – acoustic guitar 
 Fred Tackett – guitar 
 Michael Thompson – guitar 
 Nathan East – bass
 Randy Jackson – bass
 Tony Levin – bass
 Freddie Washington – bass
 Omar Hakim – drums
 Tris Imboden – drums 
 John Robinson – drums
 Zakir Hussain – percussion 
 Munyungo Jackson – percussion
 Kevin Ricard – percussion
 Bill Summers – percussion
 John Zeretzke – duduk, flute
 Everette Harp – saxophone 
 Karen Briggs – violin 
 Jeremy Lubbock – string arrangements and conductor (13)
 Joey Blake – backing vocals
 Karla Bonoff – backing vocals
 Joey Diggs – backing vocals
 Jim Gilstrap – backing vocals
 Bobbi Page – backing vocals
 Chris Rodriguez – backing vocals
 Howard Smith – backing vocals
 Lamont Van Hook – backing vocals
 Carvin Winans – backing vocals
 Agape Choir of Santa Monica – choir
 Lynn Davis – backing vocals (13)
 Sandy Griffith – backing vocals (13)
 Phillip Ingram – backing vocals (13)
 Skyler Jett – backing vocals (13)
 Conesha Owens – backing vocals (13)
 Claytoven Richardson – backing vocals (13)
 Jeanie Tracy – backing vocals (13)

References

1997 albums
Kenny Loggins albums
Columbia Records albums